Tmesipteris elongata is a fern ally endemic to south eastern Australia and New Zealand. Often seen growing on soft tree ferns in moist valleys.

References

Psilotaceae
Flora of New Zealand
Flora of Victoria (Australia)
Flora of Tasmania
Epiphytes